The Friends of Distinction were an American vocal group founded by Harry Elston and Floyd Butler, best known for their late 1960s hits, "Grazing in the Grass", "Love or Let Me Be Lonely", and "Going in Circles".

Career
The Friends of Distinction  formed in 1968 in Los Angeles with original members Floyd Butler (June 5, 1937 – April 29, 1990), Harry Elston (born November 4, 1938), Jessica Cleaves (December 10, 1948 – May 2, 2014), and Barbara Jean Love (born July 24, 1941). Butler and Elston had worked together in The Hi-Fi's in the mid 1960s, often opening for Ray Charles.  Other members of the Hi-Fi's were Marilyn McCoo and Lamont McLemore, who would later co-found The Fifth Dimension.

The Friends of Distinction were discovered by American football player Jim Brown, who also discovered Earth, Wind & Fire , and were signed to RCA Records.

The Friends' first major hit, "Grazing in the Grass", was an Elston-sung vocal cover version of an instrumental hit by Hugh Masekela, with lyrics written by Elston.  Released in March 1969, this gold record went Top 5 on both the pop and soul charts in the U.S., peaking at No. 3 on the Billboard Hot 100 in June.  The follow-up ballad "Going in Circles" also charted highly, hitting No. 15 in November.

When Love took time off during her pregnancy, Charlene Gibson replaced her, singing lead on the Friends' third hit, "Love or Let Me Be Lonely", which peaked at No. 6 on the Billboard Hot 100 on 2-9 May 1970. The Friends were prolific between 1969 and 1973, releasing six albums, with a seventh in 1976. They also released numerous singles, including "Check It Out" and a cover of Neil Sedaka's "Time Waits for No One".

The group quit touring in 1976, and broke up soon afterward. Cleaves sang with Earth, Wind & Fire for a number of years. 

"Going in Circles" has been covered by Isaac Hayes, The Gap Band and Luther Vandross, and "Love or Let Me Be Lonely" by Paul Davis. 

In 1990, Elston and Butler planned to revive the Friends of Distinction, but Butler suffered a heart attack and died at the age of 52 on April 29 of that year. He had already written songs for the group and one composition he co-wrote, "Check It Out", was a hit for the group Tavares. Elston formed a new quartet, also called The Friends of Distinction, and the group continues to give live performances.

Jessica Cleaves died on May 2, 2014, from a stroke at the age of 65.

Discography

Studio albums

Compilation albums
Greatest Hits (1973, RCA Victor)
Golden Classics (1989, Collectables)
Best of the Friends of Distinction (1996, RCA)
Going in Circles (2005, RCA/Sony BMG)

Singles

References

External links

The Friends of Distinction at Soul Tracks

African-American musical groups
American soul musical groups
American vocal groups
Musical groups established in 1968
Musical groups from Los Angeles
RCA Records artists
Sunshine pop